Børge André Rannestad (born 16 August 1973) is a retired Norwegian football midfielder.

Hailing from Moi, he came up in the club Moi IL. He represented Norway numerous times from u-16 through u-20 level, including as a squad member at the 1993 FIFA World Youth Championship.

He had a stint in Bryne before joining Kvinesdal in 1992, only to move on to the region's top-tier team and reigning league champions Viking FK in the summer of 1992. Recording a maximum of 8 league games during one season, namely in 1993, he went on to Odds BK in 1996.

The team secured promotion to 1999 Tippeligaen, but the 1999 season was marred by long-term injury for Rannestad. He played for Mandalskameratene in 2000, before retiring, later featuring occasionally for Kvinesdal IL, now on the seventh tier.

References

1973 births
Living people
People from Lund, Norway
Norwegian footballers
Bryne FK players
Viking FK players
Odds BK players
Mandalskameratene players
Eliteserien players
Norwegian First Division players
Association football midfielders
Norway youth international footballers
Sportspeople from Rogaland